SS River Afton was a steam merchant built in 1935 by Lithgows, of Port Glasgow, Scotland and homeported in Glasgow.  She was operated by Campbell Brothers & Co, Newcastle-upon-Tyne.  She was named after the River Afton in Ayrshire, Scotland.

Wartime career
She was used in a number of Arctic convoys, to deliver supplies from the Western Allies to the Soviet Union.  She took part in Convoy PQ 1 and Convoy PQ 13, and made the return voyages as part of Convoys QP 2 and QP 10.  Her last voyage was with the ill-fated Convoy PQ 17 in June 1942.

Commanded by her master, Harold William Charlton, she sailed from Middlesbrough bound for Archangel via Reykjavík, carrying a cargo of 2,314 tons of military stores, 36 tanks, 12 vehicles and seven aircraft. She was the ship of the convoy commodore John C.K. Dowding. U-703 torpedoed the ship, causing significant damage. She sank after being hit by two more torpedoes at 21:05 and 21:22, which caused her to explode and break in two. 15 crew members, eight gunners, one passenger and two naval staff members went down with the ship.

References
River Afton at Uboat.net
Convoy web
SS River Afton on the Arnold Hague database at convoyweb.org.uk.

External links
 Imperial War Museum Interview with Harold Charlton

Ships sunk by German submarines in World War II
Steamships
Ships built on the River Clyde
World War II merchant ships of the United Kingdom
1935 ships
Maritime incidents in July 1942
World War II shipwrecks in the Arctic Ocean